USS Power is a name used more than once by the United States Navy:

 USS Power (AMc-96), renamed 
 , a World War II destroyer

United States Navy ship names